Archaeorrhynchus is an extinct genus of weevil from the family Nemonychidae. It is known from the Callovian-Oxfordian Karabastau Formation in Kazakhstan. The type species, Archaeorrhynchus tenuicornis, was named in 1926. Two other species, A. tenuicornis and A. carpenteri, were described from the same locality.

References

†
Prehistoric beetles
Fossil taxa described in 1926